Girls for Gender Equity (GGE) is a Brooklyn, New York-based, inter-generational non-profit organization, through a black feminist lens, dedicated to strengthening local communities by creating opportunities for young women and girls to live self-determined lives. To achieve this goal, GGE practices a bio-psycho-social-cultural approach to tackling the many obstacles young women and girls face such as sexism, racial inequality, homophobia, transphobia, and sexual harassment.

In the year 2000, GGE was founded by Joanne N. Smith, in response to a coalition of 80 low-income Central Brooklyn residents of color petitioning the Open Society Institute (OSI) to help in the fight to change the negative perceptions society has of women and girls. Inspired by their cause, Smith used the OSI fellowship to launch Girls for Gender Equity. Through educational, physical, and social programs, GGE aims to provide young women and girls with the tools to acknowledge their strengths, develop their skills, and ultimately live self-sufficient lives.

Programs
Girls for Gender Equity’s after-school and youth organizing programs, along with cultural change, work to provide the education, information, and resources necessary to help ensure the safety of youth in their schools and communities.

Sisters in Strength
Sisters in Strength (SIS) is a youth organizing program for social justice education for 15 young women of color who are entering either the 10th or 11th grade and takes place over two years. Participants are typically women between the ages of 15 and 18 years, who are survivors of gender-based violence. GGE’s vision, mission, and goals, as well as the individual needs and interests of each youth organizer, shape SIS's programming. SIS confronts what it describes as "several levels of individual and institutional discrimination that threaten the safety of girls and women" through community organizing.

In a civic engagement exercise, SIS youth organizers discussed the founding documents that shaped the United States and its values. In a community with other Black girls at the Black Girl Movement Conference, they imagined a new world that values Black girls, a world where girls and all women of color would come together to create a world that they would want to live in. They created the Black Girl Bill of Rights as their founding document. On April 28, 2016, Joanne N. Smith, Founder and Executive Director of Girls for Gender Equity, presented the Black Girl Bill of Rights to the Congressional Caucus on Black Women and Girls at the first Caucus Symposium, “Barriers and Pathways to Success for Black Women and Girls” in the Member’s Room, Library of Congress, Thomas Jefferson Building.

The Coalition for Gender Equity in Schools
The Coalition for Gender Equity in Schools' (CGES) mission is to end sexual harassment and violence in schools by empowering young people to speak up and fight against negative normalized behavior, including offensive comments, LGBT bullying, and unwanted touches. GGE is the lead organizer of this alliance of students, teachers, parents, and other school community members that are passionate about changing the culture of schools and creating a sense of community that is rooted in mutual respect.

Urban Leaders Academy
Urban Leaders Academy (ULA) is a holistic after-school program that is dedicated to advancing the values, ethics, determination, and leadership skills of junior high school students. There are currently two schools in Brooklyn that participate in GGE’s Urban Leaders Academy,  J.H.S. 78 – Roy H. Mann Middle School and I.S. 14 – Shell Bank Middle School. At each location, ULA’s mentors and staff serve as many as 90 students a day to cater to students’ unique needs and provide enrichment programs their schools are not able to offer. GGE'S youth development model consists of leadership programs, raising consciousness by encouraging youth to think critically about their place in society, exploring the concept of identity, setting career goals, community organizing for social justice, building awareness about the importance of nutrition, and practicing physical fitness.

Initiatives

Young Women’s Initiative
In 2015, Girls for Gender Equity played a role in helping the City Council of New York create the Young Women's Initiative as a counterpart to Young Men’s Initiative. Mayor Michael Bloomberg started this initiative in 2011, with the intention to offer equal opportunities to Black and Latino men and boys in southeast Queens, northern Manhattan, the South Bronx, and Staten Island’s North Shore. In a press release, New York City Council Speaker Melissa Mark-Viverito called YWI "the first coalition in the United States to tackle the systemic gender-based inequality."

In May 2016, the Young Women's Initiative released a comprehensive report consisting of a detailed agenda of over one hundred recommendations to improve the lives of young women and girls in New York City. These recommendations cover five key areas that have the greatest impact on an individual's quality of life; health, economic and workforce development, community support and opportunity, education, and anti-violence and criminal justice.

GGE in the media

Anita documentary
GGE's Sisters in Strength were featured in a segment of Oscar-winning director Freida Mock’s documentary Anita to shine light on their work raising awareness on gender issues. The film tells the story of Anita Hill’s fight against sexual harassment in the workplace and her heroic testimony against U.S. Supreme Court Nominee Clarence Thomas.

NY1
On October 22, 2015, Joanne Smith of Girls for Gender Equity discussed a new City Council initiative to help young women with a special panel, including Errol Louis, City Council Speaker Melissa Mark-Viverito, Ana Oliveira from the New York Women’s Foundation, and Danielle Moss Lee from the YWCA of New York City.

Melissa Harris-Perry
 On May 20, 2016, Melissa Harris-Perry was a guest on the 2016 Power Players week of Jeopardy! and played in support of Girls for Gender Equity.
 On November 24, 2012, GGE Youth Organizer, Emily Carpenter, of Girls Against Gender Equity, joined Melissa Harris-Perry to discuss what President Obama’s second term means to her, as young Black woman.
 On August 19, 2012, Girls for Gender Equity’s Natasha Adams joined Melissa Harris-Perry to discuss the negative campaigning of the 2012 election cycle and the ways young people were reacting.
 On May 20, 2012, GGE's several of youth organizers joined Melissa Harris-Perry on a panel to discuss how the different forms of feminism.

The Daily Show with Jon Stewart
On April 17, 2012, Joanne Smith was featured on a segment of The Daily Show with Jon Stewart.

Awards and honors

Mother Tongue Monologue
On February 26, 2016, Joanne Smith was honored by Black Women's Blueprint at their annual Mother Tongue Monologue: A Praise Song for Black Girls Reclaiming Our Mother's Bones for her revolutionary work at GGE.

Amtrak Pioneer Award
In 2016, Joanne Smith was one of the winners of The Amtrak Pioneer Award, which honors African Americans who have made positive contributions to communities in Brooklyn.

1804 Haitian-American Change Maker
On March 21, 2015, Joanne Smith was honored by the Haitian Round Table 1804 as a Haitian American Changemaker for making influential changes in her community.

Shirley Chisholm Women of Distinction Award
On March 20, 2015, Joanne Smith was awarded with a Shirley Chisholm Women of Distinction award at Brooklyn Public Library Central Branch by NYC Council Members Jumaane D. Williams and Laurie A. Cumbo in honor of her work in public service.

New York’s New Abolitionists
On May 23, 2013, Joanne Smith was honored by becoming one of New York’s New Abolitionists for her support fighting against human trafficking.

Grio Award
In 2013, GGE's Community Organizer Nefertiti Martin, and Youth Organizer Emily Carpenter were honored by being included on the 4th annual Grio Top 100 African American History Makers list for “embodying the best attributes of their generation: creativity, fearlessness, and a powerful belief that each individual can change the world. Nefertiti has practiced her activism as a member of a number of organizations, including FIERCE, the Hetrick-Martin Institute, In the Life Media, the Lesbian Cancer Initiative and Theatre Askew Youth Performance Experience, as well as Girls for Gender Equity.”

The New York Women’s Foundation Neighborhood Leadership Award
On October 16, 2012, The New York Women’s Foundation honored Smith with a Neighborhood Leadership Award.

The French-American Foundation Young Leaders Program
In 2012, Smith was honored by The French American Foundation's Young Leaders Program for her work.

See also 
 Geena Davis Institute on Gender in Media

References

External links 

Gender equality
Non-profit organizations based in New York (state)
Organizations established in 2000
2000 establishments in New York City
Women in New York City